Mohammad Imran Khan (born 15 July 1987) is a Pakistani cricketer, born in Maidan valley of Lower Dir in Khyber Pakhtunkhwa. He made his Test match debut for Pakistan against Australia in the United Arab Emirates on 22 October 2014. Imran has played domestically for Peshawar, Khyber Pakhtunkhwa, the Water and Power Development Authority, the National Bank of Pakistan, Zarai Taraqiati Bank, and the Peshawar Panthers.

Career
Imran and the Panthers side won the 2014–15 edition of the Haier T20 Cup, and another member of the tournament-winning team was Imran Khan (born 1988). For this reason, Imran Khan (born 1987), the subject of this article, is often recorded as "Mohammad Imran Khan" or "Imran Khan, Sr." on scorecards, while Imran Khan (born 1988) is often recorded as "Imran Khan (Swat)" or "Imran Khan, Jr.".

He was the leading wicket-taker for Khyber Pakhtunkhwa in the 2017 Pakistan Cup, with six dismissals in three matches.

In April 2018, he was named in Punjab's squad for the 2018 Pakistan Cup. In September 2019, he was named in Khyber Pakhtunkhwa's squad for the 2019–20 Quaid-e-Azam Trophy tournament.

In October 2019, he was recalled to Pakistan's Test squad, for the series against Australia, where he took a single wicket in the game he played. Khan last played Test cricket in January 2017. In December 2019, he was named in Pakistan's Test squad for the two-match series against Sri Lanka.

In June 2020, he was named in a 29-man squad for Pakistan's tour to England during the COVID-19 pandemic. However, on 23 June 2020, Khan was one of seven players from Pakistan's squad to test positive for COVID-19. In July, he was shortlisted in Pakistan's 20-man squad for the Test matches against England.

In January 2021, he was named in Khyber Pakhtunkhwa's squad for the 2020–21 Pakistan Cup. He was the leading wicket-taker in the 2021–22 National T20 Cup, with sixteen dismissals.

References

External links
 

1987 births
Living people
Khyber Pakhtunkhwa cricketers
National Bank of Pakistan cricketers
Pakistani cricketers
Pakistan Test cricketers
People from Lower Dir District
Pashtun people
Peshawar cricketers
Peshawar Panthers cricketers
Water and Power Development Authority cricketers
Zarai Taraqiati Bank Limited cricketers
Barbados Royals cricketers